Ephrata High School, located in Ephrata, Washington, is a high school that serves 731 students in grades 9 through 12. The current principal is Aaron Cummings.

Demographics
77% of the school's students are white, while 17% are Hispanic, 2% are Asian, 2% are black and 1% are American Indian.

References

Public high schools in Washington (state)
High schools in Grant County, Washington